The Inner Ring Road (IRR), also known as Jawaharlal Nehru Salai or 100-Feet road or State Highway 2, is a major transportation corridor encircling the city of Chennai. It was developed by the Chennai Metropolitan Development Authority (CMDA). It is 25.2 km long with three distinct arms viz., Northern arm, Central arm and Southern arm, connecting SH 49A (Rajiv Gandhi Salai) in Tiruvanmiyur, Velachery main road at Vijayanagar, NH 32 (GST road) at Kathipara, NH 4 at Koyambedu, NH 205 at Padi, NH 5 at Madhavaram and joins SH 104 (TPP Road) at Manali.

Details of the corridor
The IRR is a 6 lane road with three arms. The northern arm of IRR starts from Padi Junction and joins SH 104 (TPP) near Manali. It connects NH5 at Madhavaram Junction. The central arm extends from Kathipara Junction and ends at Padi Junction. It connects NH 32 at Kathipara Junction, NH4 at Koyambedu Junction and NH 205 at Padi Junction. The northern and central arms together forming the State Highway 2. The southern arm of IRR extends from IT corridor in the form of Taramani Link Road and joins NH 32 at Officers Training Academy before ending at Kathipara Junction. The Chennai RBTW is being planned along the Taramani Link Road.

See also

 Transport in Chennai

References

Roads in Chennai
Urban road transit in Chennai
Ring roads in India